Politics of East Timor takes place in a framework of a unitary semi-presidential representative democratic republic, whereby the Prime Minister of East Timor is the head of government and the President of East Timor exercises the functions of head of state. East Timor has a multi-party system. Executive power is exercised by the president and the government. Legislative power is vested in both the government and the National Parliament. The Judiciary is independent of the executive and the legislature.
The East Timorese constitution was modelled on that of Portugal, though the president is less powerful than the Portuguese counterpart. The country is still in the process of building its administration and governmental institutions.

Executive branch

The head of state of the East Timorese republic is the President, who is directly elected by popular vote for a five-year term, and whose executive powers are somewhat limited by the constitution, though this official is able to veto legislation, which action can be overridden by the parliament. Following elections, the president usually appoints as the prime minister, the leader of the majority party or majority coalition. As head of government the prime minister presides over the cabinet.

|President
|José Ramos-Horta
|CNRT
|20 May 2022
|-
|Prime Minister
|Taur Matan Ruak
|PLP
|22 June 2018
|}

Legislative branch

The unicameral Timorese National Parliament (Parlamento Nacional) has 65 members elected by proportional representation (d'Hondt method) for a five-year term. The number of seats can vary from a minimum of 52 to a maximum of 65, though it exceptionally had 88 members during its first term which also exceptionally lasted six years – from 2001 to 2007 – this was because the constitution provided that the 88-member Constitutional Assembly would become the first parliament after the constitution entered into force in 2002.

The East Timorese constitution was modelled on that of Portugal. The country is still in the process of building its administration and governmental institutions.

Political parties and elections

Presidential elections

Parliamentary elections

Recent development 

Francisco Guterres of centre-left Fretilin party was the president of East Timor since May 2017 until May 2022. The main party of AMP coalition, National Congress for Timorese Reconstruction, led by independence hero Xanana Gusmao, was in power from 2007-17, but leader of Fretilin  Mari Alkatiri formed a coalition government after July 2017  parliamentary election. However, the new minority government soon fell, meaning second general election in May 2018. In June 2018,  former president and independence fighter Jose Maria de Vasconcelos known as Taur Matan Ruak of three-party coalition, Alliance of Change for Progress (AMP), became the new prime minister.
José Ramos-Horta of the centre-left CNRT has served as the president of East Timor since 20 May 2022 after winning the April 2022 presidential election runoff.

Judicial branch
The Supreme Court of Justice has one judge appointed by the National Parliament and the rest appointed by the Superior Council for the Judiciary. As mentioned in a 2010 source, the country was in the process of developing a legal system that includes private practice attorneys.

Administrative divisions

East Timor is divided into thirteen municipalities:

The districts are subdivided into 65 subdistricts, 443 sucos and 2,336 towns, villages and hamlets.

Cabinet

Matan Ruak (2018–present)

Alkatiri II (2017–2018) 

Araújo (2015–2017)

Gusmão II (2012-2015)

Gusmão I (2007-2012)

Alkatiri (2002-2007)

References

Further reading

External links
 
 

 
East Timor